The C. G. Jung Institute, Zürich (German: C. G. Jung-Institut Zürich) was founded in Küsnacht, Switzerland, in 1948 by the psychiatrist Carl Gustav Jung, the founder of Analytical psychology (more commonly called Jungian psychology). Marie-Louise von Franz and Jolande Jacobi were also active in the foundation and early work of the institute.

The institute was founded in 1948 to provide training and conduct research in Analytical psychology and psychotherapy. Jung led the institute until 1961, the year of his death. The library of the institute holds around 15,000 books and periodicals related to Jungian psychology.

Several other organizations named the C.G. Jung Institute exist around the world, e.g. in Los Angeles.

See also 
 Psychology Club Zürich

References

External links 

 Institute website (in English and German)

Carl Jung
Institute
Küsnacht
Research institutes established in 1948
Psychology institutes
Psychology organisations based in Switzerland